Tarucachi District is one of eight districts of the province Tarata in Peru.

See also 
 Khuruña

References